Royal Air Force College  may refer to:

 Royal Air Force College in Cranwell 
 Royal Air Force Staff College, Andover
 Royal Air Force Staff College, Bracknell

See also

 Royal Australian Air Force College